Joe Batley (born 27 June 1996) is an English rugby union player who plays at Second Row, Flanker or Number 8 at Bristol Bears.

A graduate of Gloucester academy. Batley signed his first professional contract with local rivals Bristol Rugby who compete in the RFU Championship from the 2017-18 season.

Batley represented England U18s in a friendly tour match against France He then represented England U20s during the 2015 World Rugby Under 20 Championship

On 13 May 2020, Batley would sign for Worcester Warriors on a one-year deal for the 2020-21 season. On 5 October 2022 all Worcester players had their contacts terminated due to the liquidation of the company to which they were contracted.

Following the termination of his contract at Worcester it confirmed that he would return to Bristol Bears.

References

External links
Gloucester Rugby Profile

English rugby union players
1996 births
Living people
Gloucester Rugby players
Rotherham Titans players
Bristol Bears players
Hartpury University R.F.C. players
Leicester Tigers players
Worcester Warriors players
Rugby union flankers